Seraina Mischol (born 1 December 1981) is a Swiss cross-country skier, who competed between 1999 and 2011.

Cross-country skiing results
All results are sourced from the International Ski Federation (FIS).

Olympic Games

World Championships

a.  Cancelled due to extremely cold weather.

World Cup

Season standings

References

External links

Home page

Cross-country skiers at the 2006 Winter Olympics
Swiss female cross-country skiers
Olympic cross-country skiers of Switzerland
Living people
1981 births
21st-century Swiss women